KAJM (104.3 FM) is a commercial rhythmic oldies-formatted radio station in Camp Verde, Arizona, broadcasting to Phoenix, Arizona.  Its studios are located on Indian School Road in Phoenix, and its transmitter is in Crown King.

History
The station began in the summer of 1984 as KKJJ 103.9, a Class A station licensed to Payson, and would remain until 1987, when they got the approval and completed the move to 104.3.  The original format was country.

Callsigns since then included first KAFM then KRIM  then KBZG which were in use during part of the KBZR simulcast.  The KRIM calls once dropped for KBZG were picked up later when KRIM-LP took them.

Previous formats include country, an AOR/Modern Rock/CHR format called "The Blaze", a simulcast of CHR/Rhythmic KBZR-Coolidge (later KPTY-Gilbert), a return of the "Blaze" format (under the new name "CD Rock"), Traditional Oldies as "K-Best", and a 60’s-90’s Rhythmic Oldies format, under the name "Arizona Jamz", featuring sweepers with "Beavis and Butthead" sound bytes.

Carey Edwards, an established Phoenix air talent who had most recently been programming Rhythmic Oldies KGMG "Mega 106.3" in Tucson, was brought to the station. Soon after his arrival, allaccess.com reported that KAJM would be "relaunched" soon. On April 20, 2001, at 5:00 pm, as Edwards applied the formula from KGMG — KAJM became "Mega 104.3 & 99.3". Since then, the station has shifted towards a gold-based Urban Adult Contemporary direction in part due to having a sister station in KNRJ, whose playlist and direction features an Urban Contemporary direction with a heavy emphasis on Classic Hip-Hop. As of June 2011, KAJM has picked up competition from Gold-based Rhythmic AC KYOT-FM, a move that prompted KAJM to rechristen its slogan to "Arizona's #1 Old School Station" to counter KYOT-FM's library of R&B/Pop/Dance classics (KYOT-FM has since flipped to adult hits).

Move
In June 2007, KAJM moved its signal at 104.3 MHz from a location north of Payson, to Wildflower Mountain near Crown King, and changed its city of license to Camp Verde. Despite a power reduction, this location gives the station a little better coverage in the Phoenix metropolitan area, mainly in the western suburbs. The 99.3 translator would become part of KNRJ.

References

External links

Audio : "Arizona JamZ" becomes "Mega"

AJM
Rhythmic oldies radio stations in the United States
Radio stations established in 1984
1984 establishments in Arizona